Rodrigue Nordin (born 22 March 1971 in Saint-Denis) is a retired French sprinter who specialized in the 200 metres.

He finished fifth at the 1998 European Championships. At the 1997 World Indoor Championships he won a bronze medal in 4 × 400 metres relay with teammates Pierre Marie Hilaire, Loïc Lerouge and Fred Mango.

References

1971 births
Living people
Sportspeople from Saint-Denis, Seine-Saint-Denis
French male sprinters
Mediterranean Games silver medalists for France
Mediterranean Games medalists in athletics
Athletes (track and field) at the 1997 Mediterranean Games
World Athletics Indoor Championships medalists